Christian Dale Lister (born 14 July 1968) is a former Australian rules footballer who played for St Kilda in the Australian Football League (AFL) in 1990. He was recruited from the Golden Square Football Club in the Bendigo Football League (BFL) with the 77th selection in the 1989 VFL Draft.

References

External links

Living people
1968 births
St Kilda Football Club players
Golden Square Football Club players
Australian rules footballers from Victoria (Australia)